Woolfardisworthy (pronounced "Woolsery") is a village and civil parish in Mid Devon. It is situated about 9 km north of Crediton.

According to the Oxford Dictionary of English Place Names (Eilert Ekwall, 4th ed., 1960), the origin of the name is probably "Wulfheard's homestead". The element "worthy" is from Old English worþig, one of several words for a homestead or small settlement found in English place names. Along with a few other places in Devon, it is one of the longest place names in England with 16 letters.

The civil parish also contains the village of Black Dog.

External links
 

Villages in Devon